This glossary of computer science is a list of definitions of terms and concepts used in computer science, its sub-disciplines, and related fields, including terms relevant to software, data science, and .

A

B

C

D

E

F

G

H

I

J

K

L

M

N

O

P

Q

R

S

T

U

V

W

X

See also
Outline of computer science

References

Notes

 
science
Computer science
Computers
Wikipedia glossaries using description lists